Nola cilicoides, the blurry-patched nola moth, is a species of nolid moth in the family Nolidae.

The MONA or Hodges number for Nola cilicoides is 8990.

References

Further reading

 
 
 

cilicoides
Articles created by Qbugbot
Moths described in 1873